Alison Van Uytvanck was the reigning champion, but chose not to participate.

Anhelina Kalinina won the title, defeating Clara Tauson in the final, 6–3, 5–7, 6–4.

Seeds

Draw

Finals

Top half

Bottom half

Qualifying

Seeds

Qualifiers

Lucky losers

Draw

First qualifier

Second qualifier

Third qualifier

Fourth qualifier

References

External links
Main draw
Qualifying draw

2022 WTA 125 tournaments